"Run With Us" is the end theme song for the 1980s television series The Raccoons. It was written by Kevin Gillis, Jon Stroll and Steve Lunt.

The song was originally recorded by Steve Lunt for the first season in 1985 but was later covered by and is more associated with Lisa Lougheed and included on her first album Evergreen Nights, as well as being heard at the end of every Raccoons episode from the second season until the series ended in 1991. The song featured in several episodes of the series. Lunt's version is set to be released in a remastered form from the original tapes alongside a remaster of Lougheed's cover as part of the show's 40th anniversary.

Notable appearances and cover versions
 The song was included in the closing credits of Canadian filmmaker Jason Eisener's film Hobo with a Shotgun.
 The song was featured on Cover Boy, an EP by British singer Matt Fishel. 
 The song was covered by Bright Light Bright Light on the album Cinematography 2: Back in the Habit.
 A dance remix version was recorded by British pop duo Spray.

References

1985 songs
Songs from animated series
Animated series theme songs
Children's television theme songs
1987 debut singles
Songs about friendship
The Raccoons